This page provides supplementary chemical data on p-xylene.

Material Safety Data Sheet  
The handling of this chemical may incur notable safety precautions. It is highly recommend that you seek the Material Safety Datasheet (MSDS) for this chemical from a reliable source and follow its directions.
MATHESON TRI-GAS, INC.

Structure and properties

Thermodynamic properties

Vapor pressure of liquid

Table data obtained from CRC Handbook of Chemistry and Physics 44th ed.

Distillation data

Spectral data

References
Notes

Bibliography
NIST Standard Reference Database

Xylene
Chemical data pages cleanup